Tollerton railway station served the village of Tollerton, Yorkshire, England from 1841 to 1965 on the East Coast Main Line.

History 
The station was opened on 1 August 1841 by the Great North of England Railway. The first site of the station was situated southeast of Sykes Lane Bridge and the second site was situated northwest of Sykes Lane Bridge. A goods yard was provided to the northwest end of the old sidings. In 1937, Tollerton's services were reduced significantly to the point that there were no feasible provisions for people commuting from work in York. Sunday services ceased in 1943. Another passenger service from York to Pickering ceased on 2 February 1952, leaving only two services on the timetable; two morning services to and from Edinburgh. This station managed to survive the purge of stations on 15 September 1958, the reason for this being unclear. It was later closed on 1 November 1965, to both passengers and goods traffic.

Accidents and incidents
On 4 June 1950, a passenger train was derailed near Tollerton due to buckling of the track in hot weather. Thirteen people were injured

References

External links 

Disused railway stations in North Yorkshire
Former North Eastern Railway (UK) stations
Railway stations in Great Britain opened in 1841
Railway stations in Great Britain closed in 1965
1841 establishments in England
1965 disestablishments in England
Beeching closures in England